Holcomycteronus is a genus of cusk-eels. It includes Holcomycteronus profundissimus, long thought to be the deepest-living fish in the world's oceans.

Species
There are currently six recognized species in this genus. Many were formerly considered species of Neobythites or Grimaldichthys.
 Holcomycteronus aequatoris (H. M. Smith & Radcliffe, 1913)
 Holcomycteronus brucei (Dollo, 1906)
 Holcomycteronus digittatus Garman, 1899
 Holcomycteronus profundissimus (Roule, 1913)
 Holcomycteronus pterotus (Alcock, 1890)
 Holcomycteronus squamosus (Roule, 1916)

References

Ophidiidae
Marine fish genera
Taxa named by Samuel Garman